The Bayer designation Theta Sagittarii (θ Sagittarii) is shared by two stars, θ1 Sagittarii and θ2 Sagittarii, in the constellation Sagittarius. The pair are separated by 0.58° in the sky.

 θ1 Sagittarii
 θ2 Sagittarii

Sagittarii, Theta
Sagittarius (constellation)